Non-skid is a surface applied to the deck of a ship to increase the coefficient of friction and reduce the probability of footwear or vehicle tires sliding along a smooth wet surface. When decks are painted for protection against wear and corrosion, non-skid may be formed by either mixing a granular material like sand into the paint prior to application, or by sprinkling dry sand onto a newly painted surface before the paint hardens by drying or curing.

Examples

Sources

Watercraft components